Be Here Now may refer to:

 Be Here Now (book), a 1971 book on spirituality by Ram Dass
 Be Here Now, a 2015 documentary film about actor Andy Whitfield having cancer
 Be Here Now, a 2017 dance work choreographed by Trey McIntyre

Albums
 Be Here Now (album) or the title song, by Oasis, 1997
 Be Here Now, by the Mynabirds, 2017
 Be Here Now, by Suzanne Little, 1995
 Be Here Now: Solo Live, by Steve Forbert, 1994

Songs
 "Be Here Now" (Basement song), 2018
 "Be Here Now" (George Harrison song), 1973
 "Be Here Now", by As Tall as Lions from As Tall as Lions, 2006
 "Be Here Now", by Hybrid from the Driveclub video game soundtrack, 2014
 "Be Here Now", by Loop from A Gilded Eternity, 1990
 "Be Here Now", by Mason Jennings from Boneclouds, 2006
 "Be Here Now", by Ray LaMontagne from Till the Sun Turns Black, 2006
 "Be Here Now", by Thessalonians from Soulcraft, 1993